The NFCA National Freshman of the Year is an award given by Schutt Sports to the best college softball freshman of the year. The award has been given annually since 2014. The award is voted on by the members of the NFCA's NCAA Division I All-American Committee.

Key

Winners

References

Awards established in 2014
College softball trophies and awards in the United States